Moniligastridae is a family of earthworms native to South and Eastern Asia, containing around 200 species and five genera.

Genera
Desmogaster Rosa, 1890 
Drawida Michaelsen, 1900
Eupolygaster Michaelsen, 1900 	 
Hastirogaster Gates, 1930 	 
Moniligaster Perrier, 1872

References

Clitellata
Annelid families